Paruyr Sevak is a village in the Ararat Municipality of the Ararat Province of Armenia. The village was founded in 1978 and is named in honour of the poet Paruyr Sevak.

References 

Populated places in Ararat Province
Populated places established in 1978
Cities and towns built in the Soviet Union